Amphitrite was launched at Hamburg in 1794.  She traded primarily between London and Hambro. A French privateer captured her in 1798.

Career
Amphitrite first appeared in Lloyd's Register in 1794 with Sanderman, master and owner, and trade London–Hamburg.

Lloyd's Register for 1798 showed Amphitrite with Sanderman, master and owner, and trade London–Hamburg.

Fate
Lloyd's List reported on 2 November 1798 that a French privateer had captured Amphitrite, Sanderson, master, as Amphitrite was sailing from Hambro to Havana. The privateer sent Amphitrite into Havana.

Citations

1794 ships
Age of Sail merchant ships of England
Captured ships